Bonus Pastor Catholic College  is a voluntary aided, Roman Catholic coeducational school for 900 pupils. The school was founded by the Catholic Church in September 1958 to provide education for children of Catholic families.

The College today 
Bonus Pastor is based on two sites. Years 7 and 8 are taught on the Churchdown site; Years 9, 10 and 11 on the Winlaton site. The playing fields in Whitefoot Lane, adjacent to the school, are used for games and athletics. The college works very closely with Trinity CE School, Christ the King Sixth Form College and Lewisham College.

Leadership of the College 
Mr J. Ronan effective from September 2018, has become the Principal of Bonus Pastor Catholic College.

Rebuild of Bonus Pastor Catholic College 
Bonus Pastor Catholic College is a five form entry secondary school occupying two separate sites; Winlaton and Churchdown campuses. The new buildings were occupied by the approximately 750 pupils in September 2012. The existing school was fully operational during construction works.

References

External links 
 Bonus Pastor Catholic College
 Christ the King Sixth Form College

Secondary schools in the London Borough of Lewisham
Catholic secondary schools in the Archdiocese of Southwark
Voluntary aided schools in London